The 2013–14 Oklahoma Sooners basketball team represented the University of Oklahoma in the 2013–14 NCAA Division I men's basketball season. The Sooners were led by Lon Kruger in his third season. The team played its home games at the Lloyd Noble Center in Norman, Oklahoma as a member of the Big 12 Conference. They finished the season 23–10, 12–6 in Big 12 play to finish in second place. They lost in the quarterfinals of the Big 12 tournament to Baylor. They received an at-large bid to the NCAA tournament where they lost in the second round to North Dakota State

Preseason

Departures

Recruits

Roster

Schedule

|-
! colspan=9 style="background:#960018; color:#FFFDD0;"| Exhibition

|-
! colspan=9 style="background:#960018; color:#FFFDD0;"| Non-conference Regular Season

|-
! colspan=9 style="background:#960018; color:#FFFDD0;"| Big 12 Regular Season

|-
! colspan=9 style="background:#960018; color:#FFFDD0;"| Big 12 Tournament

|-
! colspan=9 style="background:#960018; color:#FFFDD0;"| NCAA tournament

x- Sooner Sports Television (SSTV) is aired locally on Fox Sports. However the contract allows games to air on various affiliates. Those affiliates are FSSW, FSSW+, FSOK, FSOK+, and FCS Atlantic, Central, and Pacific.

Rankings

*AP does not release post-tournament rankings

See also
2013–14 Oklahoma Sooners women's basketball team

References

External links
Official Athletics Site of the Oklahoma Sooners - Men's Basketball

Oklahoma Sooners men's basketball seasons
Oklahoma
Oklahoma